Maltsev is a Russian male surname, its feminine counterpart is Maltseva. It may refer to

 Aleksandr Maltsev (born 1949), Russian ice hockey player
Aleksandr Maltsev (synchronised swimmer) (born 1995), Russian synchronized swimmer
 Anatoly Maltsev (1909–1967), Russian mathematician
Dmitry Maltsev (born 1991), Russian ice hockey player
Eugene Maltsev (1929—2003), Russian painter
Gleb Maltsev (born 1988), Kazakhstani football player
Leonid Maltsev (born 1949), Former Minister of Defense of Belarus
Mikhail Maltsev (born 1998), Russian ice hockey player
Nikolai Maltsev (born 1986), Russian futsal player
Oleg Maltsev (born 1967), Russian judoka
Oleg Viktorovich Maltsev (born 1975), Ukrainian psychologist
Vladimir Maltsev (born 1974), Ukrainian politician
Viacheslav Maltsev (born 1964), Russian politician
Yuliya Maltseva (born 1990), Russian discus thrower

Russian-language surnames